Hindes is a surname. Notable people with the surname include:

Andrew Hindes (born 1958), American writer and journalist
Nifa and Nishan Hindes (born 1979), English identical twin models
Philip Hindes (born 1992), British track cyclist

See also
 Hindes, Texas, an unincorporated community in Atascosa County